Welcome to Dongmakgol, also known as Battle Ground 625 (UK), is a 2005 South Korean film. Based on the same-titled long-running stage play by filmmaker/playwright Jang Jin, Park Kwang-hyun's debut film was a commercial and critical success.

The story is set in Korea during the Korean War in 1950. Soldiers from both the North and South, as well as an American pilot, find themselves in a secluded village, its residents largely unaware of the outside world, including the war.

It was South Korea's official entry for the foreign language film category of the Academy Awards in 2005, and at the time the fourth highest grossing South Korean film of all time.

Plot

In September 1950, during the Korean War, a U.S. Navy pilot named Neil Smith (Steve Taschler) is caught in a mysterious storm of butterflies and crash-lands his plane in a remote and mountainous part of Korea. He is found by villagers from the nearby mountain village of Dongmakgol, who nurse him back to health. Dongmakgol is cut off from the outside world – its inhabitants have no knowledge of modern technology and are blissfully unaware of the massive conflict raging across Korea. Smith hands a Korean-English primer to Teacher Kim (Jo Deok-hyeon), the village scholar, in an effort to communicate, but Mr Kim effectively gives up when Smith begins a barrage of complaints after being asked in English, "How are you?" as an introductory greeting.

Meanwhile, not far from the village, a platoon of North Korean soldiers is ambushed by a South Korean unit, and the ensuing skirmish leaves most of the North Koreans dead. The surviving North Korean soldiers manage to escape through a mountain passage. The North Korean soldiers, Rhee Soo-hwa (Jung Jae-young), Jang Young-hee (Im Ha-ryong), and Seo Taek-gi (Ryu Deok-hwan) are found by an absent-minded girl from Dongmakgol, named Yeo-il (Kang Hye-jung). She leads them to the village where, to the North Koreans' alarm, they find two South Korean soldiers, Pyo Hyun-chul (Shin Ha-kyun) and Moon Sang-sang (Seo Jae-kyung). The South Korean soldiers, both of whom had deserted their units and escaped into the mountains, had also been led to Dongmakgol by another villager.

The unexpected encounter triggers a Mexican standoff that lasts until the next day. Initially, the villagers are rounded up between the North and South Koreans, but having no idea what the fuss is about they slowly drift away to go about their own business (despite some of the soldiers' efforts to intimidate them into submission). The villagers, who are unfamiliar with the soldiers' weapons, continue to watch on the sidelines and wonder why the two sides are waving "sticks" and "painted potatoes" at each other (which are actually rifles and grenades, respectively). In fact, Yeo-il gleefully pulls out the pin from Taek-gi's grenade (mistaking it for a ring), sending the soldiers into further panic.

The confrontation ends only when Taek-gi, worn by fatigue, accidentally drops his now-armed grenade. While everyone else ducks for cover, Hyun-chul heroically throws himself onto the grenade, but it does not explode. Believing it to be a dud, he throws the grenade behind him in contempt, and it rolls into the village storehouse. It then explodes, incinerating the village's stockpile of corn for the winter. The remnants fall down from the sky, surrealistically, as popcorn.

The two groups of Korean soldiers are now forced to face the fact that their quarrel has condemned the village to starvation in the upcoming winter. They reluctantly agree to a truce and divert their efforts to making up for the damage they have caused. Together, the soldiers undertake work across the village, and help harvest potatoes in the fields.

They even work together to kill one of the wild boars troubling the village. The villagers then bury the boar, much to the annoyance of the soldiers (who wanted to eat it). Both the North and South Korean soldiers and Smith sneak out separately at night to dig up the boar and eat it, leading to an unplanned meal together. The mood is awkward at first, but the tension between the soldiers lessens as they share the meal with each other. However, even afterwards, members of both sides remain haunted by the memories of the terrible things they have experienced during the war.

While this is happening, Allied commanders, having lost several other planes in the area, prepare a rescue team to recover Smith, who they mistakenly believe has been captured by enemy units and is being held at a hidden mountain base. The plan is to secure Smith and evacuate him from the area, with a bomber unit flying in after Smith's extraction to destroy the anti-aircraft guns they presume are located in the base.

The rescue team, led by their commander (David Joseph Anselmo), drops in by parachute at night. They suffer heavy casualties after being swarmed by a torrent of butterflies in the air, with further casualties from the rough terrain. Meanwhile, the villagers and soldiers are holding a harvest feast. The rescue team enter the village, and, assuming it is a cover for an enemy base, begin roughing up toward the villagers. Despite the efforts of the villagers to conceal the Korean soldiers by disguising them as villagers, a firefight breaks out in which all but one of the members of the rescue team are killed, and Yeo-il is fatally wounded in the crossfire. The only survivor of the rescue team, the Korean translator, is hit over the head by Smith and is captured by the villagers.

Through the translator, the people in the village find out about the bombing plan. The North and South Korean soldiers realize that the village is in peril and that there is no time for Smith to make it back to his base to stop the bombing. They decide that the only possible way to save the village is to create a decoy "enemy base" away from the village, using equipment salvaged from another plane that went down nearby. They plan to engage the unit only far as is necessary to divert it and have it bomb the "base" instead of Dongmakgol, with the soldiers fleeing to safety.

Smith is sent back along with the translator so that he can tell the Americans that there is nothing in the village to bomb, in case they decide to send more bombers. Meanwhile, while preparing to engage the planes passing over, Taek-gi encourages the group and quips that they, being a joint North-South troop, are "Allies" too. The decoy is successful, but Young-hee and Sang-sang are killed during the initial engagement. In the end, the remaining Korean soldiers are wiped out by a blanket of bombs – however, they die smiling, knowing that Dongmakgol has been saved.

Smith breaks down in tears on the way to his base upon hearing the bombs in the distance, suspecting that the Korean soldiers have sacrificed themselves. After the bombing, at the site of the destroyed decoy base, butterflies apparate where the Korean soldiers died, which then join the swarm fluttering overhead.

Production
Having been impressed by Park Kwang-hyun's 2002 short film My Nike, Film It Suda CEO Jang Jin gave him a new project: to direct an adaptation of one of Jang's successful stage plays called Welcome to Dongmakgol. The final script was the result of 18 months of brainstorming between Jang, Park, and visual supervisor Kim Joong.

Park had been a big fan of Japanese animation director Hayao Miyazaki's work since he watched Future Boy Conan as a child. One of Miyazaki's most important collaborators was composer Joe Hisaishi. Park liked Hisaishi's music so much that he wrote the script thinking about his music, visualizing the scenes in his mind while listening to his past work. During pre-production, producer Lee Eun-ha asked Park who the best music director for the project would be; Park immediately answered, "Joe Hisaishi."  Lee then wrote a very heartfelt letter to Hisaishi, explaining their situation and translating the script into Japanese for Hisaishi's consideration. Hisaishi accepted the proposal, later stating that he was moved by the enthusiasm and sincerity in the letter, choosing Welcome to Dongmakgol as his first ever Korean film.

Awards and nominations

References

External links
  
 
 
 
 

2005 films
2000s Korean-language films
2000s war comedy-drama films
Films set in North Korea
Films set in Gangwon
Films set in the 1950s
Korean War films
Military humor in film
South Korean war comedy-drama films
Showbox films
Films scored by Joe Hisaishi
2005 directorial debut films
2005 comedy films
2005 drama films
2000s South Korean films